Macroscelides is a genus of small shrew-like animals, the round-eared sengis (also called elephant shrews), found in western Namibia and in South Africa; they are members of the clade Afrotheria.

There are three known species:

 Namib round-eared sengi, Macroscelides flavicaudatus
 Etendaka round-eared sengi, Macroscelides micus, which is only found in gravel plains in the Etendaka formation of north-west Namibia
 Karoo round-eared sengi, or short-eared elephant shrew, Macroscelides proboscideus

References 

Elephant shrews
Taxonomy articles created by Polbot
Mammal genera